James Storey (born 30 December 1929) is an English former footballer who played as a full back in the Football League for Exeter City, Rochdale and Darlington. He was also on the books of Newcastle United and Bournemouth & Boscombe Athletic without playing League football for either, and appeared in the Cheshire League for Macclesfield Town.

References

1929 births
Living people
People from Rowlands Gill
Footballers from Tyne and Wear
English footballers
Association football fullbacks
Spen Black and White F.C. players
Newcastle United F.C. players
Exeter City F.C. players
AFC Bournemouth players
Rochdale A.F.C. players
Darlington F.C. players
Macclesfield Town F.C. players
English Football League players